This is the discography of Greg Laswell, an American singer-songwriter. Overall, Laswell has released 9 studio albums, 3 extended plays and 10 iTunes music singles.

Albums

Studio albums

Extended plays

iTunes singles

References

Discographies of American artists